Cecilioides eulima is a species of  very small air-breathing land snail, a terrestrial pulmonate gastropod mollusk in the family Ferussaciidae.

This species is endemic to Madeira, Portugal.

References

Ferussaciidae
Gastropods described in 1854
Taxonomy articles created by Polbot